The Golden Net is a 1922 German silent film directed by Hans Werckmeister and starring Ernst Hofmann, Julia Serda and Charlotte Ander.

The film's sets were designed by the art director Robert Neppach.

Cast
 Ernst Hofmann as Donald
 Julia Serda as Lady Rowena
 Charlotte Ander as Alice
 Adele Sandrock as Virgine Hutten, seine Mutter
 Erra Bognar as Evelyn Morlay
 Charles Willy Kayser as Frank Hutten
 Alexander Kökert as Herzog von Erpingham
 Alfred Schmasow as Sir Adam Campbell
 Franz Schönfeld as John Tupper
 Aenderly Lebius
 Adolf E. Licho

References

Bibliography
 Bock, Hans-Michael & Bergfelder, Tim. The Concise CineGraph. Encyclopedia of German Cinema. Berghahn Books, 2009.

External links

1922 films
Films of the Weimar Republic
German silent feature films
Films directed by Hans Werckmeister
German black-and-white films
1920s German films